Jerry Lucey (born 1945 in Ballyvourney, County Cork) is an Irish former sportsperson. He played Gaelic football with his local club Naomh Abán and was a member of the Cork senior inter-county team in the 1960s.

References

1944 births
Living people
Naomh Abán Gaelic footballers
Cork inter-county Gaelic footballers
Munster inter-provincial Gaelic footballers